The Malaysia national kabaddi team represents Malaysia in international Kabaddi and is controlled by the Kabaddi Federation. The team was one of the main affiliates of International Kabaddi Federation. Engaittaraman Padmanathan act as the team manager

Tournament records

World Cup

Asian Games

Asian Beach Games

References

National sports teams of Malaysia
National kabaddi teams